Cecily Fenwick was an English squash player who won the British Open three times in 1926, 1927 and 1931. She was also the runner-up at championship three consecutive times from 1928 to 1930.

References

External links
Official British Open Squash Championships website
British Open historical data at Squashtalk.com

English female squash players
Year of birth missing
Year of death missing